The area gas boards were created under the provisions of the Gas Act 1948 enacted by Clement Attlee's post-war Labour government. The Act nationalised the British gas industry and also created the Gas Council.

History
From the early 19th century the gas supply industry in the United Kingdom was mainly operated by local authorities and private companies. A flammable gas (known as "town gas" or "coal gas") was piped to commercial, domestic and industrial customers for use as a fuel and for lighting. It was marketed to consumers by such means as the National Gas Congress and Exhibition in 1913. The gas used in the 19th and early 20th centuries was coal gas but in the period 1967–77 coal gas supplies were replaced by natural gas, first discovered in the UK North Sea in 1965.

Nationalisation 
In 1948 Clement Attlee's Labour government reshaped the gas industry, enacting the Gas Act 1948. The act nationalised the UK gas industry and 1,064 privately owned and municipal gas companies were merged into twelve area gas boards each a separate body with its own management structure. Under the Gas Act 1948 the area boards were charged with three duties:

 To develop and maintain an efficient, co-ordinated and economical system of gas supply for their areas and to satisfy, so far as it is economic to do so, all reasonable demands for gas within their area.
 To develop and maintain the efficient, co-ordinated and economical production of coke, other than metallurgical coke.
 To develop and maintain efficient methods of recovering by-products obtained in the process of manufacturing gas.

Management board 
The management board for each area board typically comprised:

 Chairman
 Deputy chairman
 Chief engineer
 Controller of research
 Controller of services
 Commercial manager
 Public relations officer
 Secretary
 Chief accountant
 Staff controller

The chairman of each area board was a member of the Gas Council. Each area board was divided into geographical groups or divisions which were often further divided into smaller districts. These boards simply became known as the "gas board", a term people still use when referring to British Gas, the company that replaced the boards when the Gas Act 1972 was passed. The area boards became regions of the British Gas Corporation.

Area gas boards

Arms

References

Natural gas industry in the United Kingdom